Puan Sri Datin Janaky (25 February 1925 – 9 May 2014), better known as Janaky Athi Nahappan, was a founding member of the Malaysian Indian Congress and one of the earliest women involved in the fight for Malaysian (then Malaya) independence.

Janaki grew up in a privileged Tamil family in Malaya and was only 16 when she heard Subhas Chandra Bose's appeal to Indians to give whatever they could for their fight for Indian independence. Immediately she took off her gold earrings and donated them. She was determined to join the women's wing, the Rani of Jhansi Regiment of the Indian National Army. There was strong family objection especially from her father. But after much persuasion, her father finally agreed.

She was among the first women to join the Indian National Army organised during the Japanese occupation of Malaya to fight for Indian independence with the Japanese. Having been brought up in luxury, she initially could not adapt to the rigours of army life. However, she gradually got used to military life and her career in the regiment took off. She became second in command of the regiment.

After World War II she emerged as a welfare activist.

Janaki found the Indian National Congress's fight for Indian independence inspiring and joined the Indian Congress Medical Mission in then Malaya. In 1946 Nahappan helped John Thivy to establish the Malayan Indian Congress, which was modelled after the Indian National Congress. The party saw Thivy as its first president. Later in life, she became a senator in the Dewan Negara of the Malaysian Parliament.

The Government of India awarded her the fourth highest civilian honour of Padma Shri in 2000. She died at her house on 9 May 2014 due to pneumonia.

See also

 Rasammah Bhupalan
 Lakshmi Sahgal

References

External links
 Mothers of substance, The Star, 20 August 2007.
 They dared to take up public office, The Star, 20 August 2007.
 Biographies of INA freedom Fighter National Archives of Singapore
 
 
 Biography of Janaky Athi Nahappan
 Puan Sri Janaky Athi Nahappan Passes Away At Age 89 

1925 births
2014 deaths
Deaths from pneumonia in Malaysia
Indian National Army personnel
Indian revolutionaries
Indian women in war
Malaysian politicians of Tamil descent
Malaysian people of Indian descent
Women members of the Dewan Negara
Women in Kuala Lumpur politics
Malaysian Indian Congress politicians
Members of the Dewan Negara
Tamil military personnel
Recipients of the Padma Shri in social work
Women in war 1900–1945
Indian people of World War II
Indian women of World War II
20th-century Indian women politicians
20th-century Indian politicians
20th-century Malaysian politicians